The 2014 South Tyneside Metropolitan Borough Council election took place on 22 May 2014 to elect members of South Tyneside Metropolitan Borough Council in England. This was on the same day as other local elections.

Results by electoral ward

Beacon & Bents ward

Bede ward

Biddick & All Saints ward

Boldon Colliery ward

Cleadon & East Boldon ward

Cleadon Park ward

Fellgate & Hedworth ward

Harton ward

Hebburn North ward

Hebburn South ward

Horsley Hill ward

Monkton ward

Primrose ward

Simonside & Rekendyke ward

West Park ward

Westoe ward

Whitburn & Marsden ward

Whiteleas ward

References

2014 English local elections
2014
21st century in Tyne and Wear